Danyang Road is a station as part of Line 18 of the Shanghai Metro. Located at the intersection of Yangshupu Road and Jiangpu Road in Yangpu District, Shanghai, the station opened with the rest of phase one of Line 18 on December 30, 2021. The station is named after the nearby Danyang Road, which intersects Jiangpu Road north of the station. To the south, the line crosses the Huangpu River into Pudong.

References 

Railway stations in Shanghai
Shanghai Metro stations in Yangpu District
Line 18, Shanghai Metro
Railway stations in China opened in 2021